St Basil's Church, Deritend (later known as St John and St Basil's Church, Deritend) is a Grade II listed former parish church in the Church of England in Birmingham.

History

The parish was formed in 1896 from parts of Holy Trinity Church, Bordesley and St Andrew's Church, Bordesley. The church building was constructed between 1910 and 1911 and was designed by Arthur Stansfield Dixon.

In 1939 the church was united with St John's Church, Deritend and St Basil's Church was used as the church of the united benefice. In 1978, St Basil's Church was closed, and the parish united with St Martin in the Bull Ring.

The church is now used as the St Basil Centre, providing help to young people.

Organ

The church was equipped with a pipe organ by Harrison and Harrison dating from 1911. A specification of the organ can be found on the National Pipe Organ Register. On closure the organ was transferred to Worcester Cathedral.

References

Church of England church buildings in Birmingham, West Midlands
Grade II listed buildings in Birmingham
Churches completed in 1911
Former Church of England church buildings
20th-century Church of England church buildings
Grade II listed churches in the West Midlands (county)